Mezholezy can refer to:

Mezholezy (former Domazlice District), Czech Republic
Mezholezy (former Horsovsky Tyn District), now also in Domažlice District, Czech Republic